Frank Gibson (17 March 1904 – 1 April 1977) was  a former Australian rules footballer who played with Fitzroy in the Victorian Football League (VFL).

Notes

External links 
		

1904 births
1977 deaths
Australian rules footballers from Victoria (Australia)
Fitzroy Football Club players